Mount Nelson is a mountain  tall, standing three miles northeast of Mount Pulitzer, near the west side of Scott Glacier in the Queen Maud Mountains, Antarctica. It was first mapped by the Byrd Antarctic Expedition (1933–35). The mountain was named by Advisory Committee on Antarctic Names (US-ACAN) for Randy L. Nelson, who made satellite geodesy studies at McMurdo Station, as part of the winter party of 1965.

Mount Nelson is located at 85 degrees 47 S Latitude, 153 degrees 48 W Longitude. (Latitude 854700S Longitude 1534800W)

Nelson, born April 11, 1937 in Cedarview, Utah, USA, was head of the team of scientists and geographers who set up satellite tracking at McMurdo Station in Antarctica in 1965, as well as many other locations worldwide. During 1965 the equipment needed to track satellites took up two large building roughly the size of a semi-trailer, in contrast GPS abilities available in hand held devices 40 years later.

See also
 List of glaciers in the Antarctic

References

Mountains of the Ross Dependency
Amundsen Coast